The following is a list of notable deaths in November 2008.

Entries for each day are listed alphabetically by surname. A typical entry lists information in the following sequence:
 Name, age, country of citizenship at birth, subsequent country of citizenship (if applicable), reason for notability, cause of death (if known), and reference.

November 2008

1
Badaró, 74, Brazilian-Portuguese actor and comedian, stomach cancer.
Jimmy Carl Black, 70, American Cheyenne drummer and vocalist (The Mothers of Invention), lung cancer.
Dermot Curtis, 76, Irish footballer (Bristol City, Ipswich Town, Republic of Ireland), after long illness.
David de Caires, 70, Guyanese journalist and editor, founder of Stabroek News, complications from heart attack.
Flockton Grey, 28, British racehorse, heart attack.
Oscar Lathlin, 61, Canadian politician, member of the Legislative Assembly of Manitoba since 1990.
Nathaniel Mayer, 64, American rhythm & blues singer, stroke.
Jacques Piccard, 86, Belgian-born Swiss oceanographer and explorer.
Rosetta Reitz, 84, American jazz historian and record company founder, cardiopulmonary disease.
Jack Reno, 72, American country music singer, brain cancer.
Tiffany Sloan, 35, American model (Playboy), suicide by drug overdose.
Shakir Stewart, 34, American vice president of Def Jam Recordings, suicide by gunshot.
Yma Sumac, 86, Peruvian soprano, cancer.
*Tan Jiazhen, 99, Chinese geneticist, multiple organ dysfunction syndrome.
Tony Tarracino, 92, American saloon keeper and politician, heart and lung ailments.

2
Ahmed al-Mirghani, 67, Sudanese politician, President (1986–1989).
Joseph Alliluyev, 63, Russian cardiologist, grandson of Joseph Stalin.
James Armsey, 90, American automotive executive, director of the Ford Foundation (1960–1967).
Madelyn Dunham, 86, American maternal grandmother of Barack Obama, cancer.
George F. Grant, 102, American angler, author and conservationist, natural causes.
Kenneth P. Johnson, 74, American newspaper editor (Dallas Times Herald), heart infection.
Jim Koleff, 55, Canadian hockey player and coach, cancer.
Domenico Leccisi, 88, Italian politician, stole corpse of Benito Mussolini, heart and respiratory disease.
Henry Loomis, 89, American Director of Voice of America (1958–1965), Alzheimer's, Parkinson's and Pick's diseases.
Jacques Lunis, 85, French Olympic silver medal-winning (1948) athlete.
Elijah Mudenda, 81, Zambian politician, Prime Minister (1975–1977).
Bill Stall, 71, American Pulitzer Prize-winning journalist (Los Angeles Times), complications from pulmonary disease.
Terence Tolbert, 44, American political campaign director for Barack Obama in Nevada, heart attack.

3
John Adams, 89, British rear admiral.
Charles T. Cross, 86, American diplomat, Ambassador to Singapore (1969–1972), Consul General in Hong Kong (1974–1977).
Mike Davis, 68, American boating advocate.
Alan Ford, 84, American Olympic swimmer, emphysema.
Jean Fournet, 95, French conductor.
Edward McMichael, 53, American tuba player, bludgeoned.
Brooks Mileson, 60, British football club owner (Gretna F.C.), complications from chronic fatigue syndrome and brain infection.
Lalit Mohan Sharma, 80, Indian jurist, Chief Justice (1992–1993).
Edward Sheehan, 78, American foreign correspondent, allergic reaction to medication.
Lhofei Shiozawa, 67, Brazilian judoka.
Josep Maria Socías, 71, Spanish lawyer and politician, Mayor of Barcelona (1976–1979).
Cecil W. Stoughton, 88, American Presidential photographer (Kennedy, Johnson), complications from hip replacement.
John Trudeau, 81, American music promoter, founder of the Britt Festival, heart failure.
I. Bernard Weinstein, 78, American cancer researcher, kidney disease.

4
Khertek Anchimaa-Toka, 96, Russian politician, chairman of Tuvan Parliament (1940–1944), world's first female head of state.
Evelio Arias Ramos, 42, Mexican actor, comedian and singer.
Ernesto Aura, 68, Spanish voice actor, cancer.
Lennart Bergelin, 83, Swedish tennis player and coach, heart failure.
Paddy Buckley, 83, Scottish footballer (Aberdeen, St Johnstone).
Jheryl Busby, 59, American record executive.
Gérald Coppenrath, 86, French journalist and Senator (1958–1962) for Tahiti, brother of Hubert and Michel Coppenrath.
Michael Crichton, 66, American author (Jurassic Park, The Andromeda Strain), director and producer (ER), throat cancer.
Rosella Hightower, 88, American ballerina, stroke.
Byron Lee, 73, Jamaican musician and record producer, bladder cancer.
Syd Lucas, 108, British World War I veteran.
Juan Camilo Mouriño, 37, Mexican Secretary of the Interior since 2008, plane crash.
Orlando Owoh, 76, Nigerian musician, stroke.
José Luis Santiago Vasconcelos, 51, Mexican politician, plane crash.

5
Ian Anderson, 54, Scottish footballer.
V. T. Arasu, 82, Singaporean journalist, civil servant, editor and author, pancreatic cancer.
Věra Černá, 70, Czech Olympic athlete.
Baldev Raj Chopra, 94, Indian film director, after long illness.
Sofron Dmyterko, 91, Ukrainian Greek Catholic bishop of Ivano-Frankivsk.
Sir Paul Greening, 80, British admiral and courtier.
Michael Higgins, 88, American actor, heart failure.
Félix Lebuhotel, 76, French cyclist.
John Leonard, 69, American media and cultural critic, complications from lung cancer.
Norm Marshall, 89, Canadian broadcaster.
Clark Miller, 70, American football player, heart attack.
John Odom, 26, American professional baseball player, accidental drug overdose.

6
Ronald Davis, 52, American health advocate, president of the AMA (2007–2008), pancreatic cancer.
Mahmoud Haroon, 88, Pakistani politician and newspaper founder.
Sir John Hermon, 79, British police officer, Chief Constable of the Royal Ulster Constabulary (1980–1989), Alzheimer's disease.
Larry James, 61, American track athlete and Olympic gold medalist (1968), cancer.
Phil Reed, 59, American politician, member of New York City Council (1998–2005), complications of pneumonia from leukemia.
Joe Wendryhoski, 69, American football player (Los Angeles Rams, New Orleans Saints), cancer and stroke.
George Winterton, 61, Australian lawyer and professor of constitutional law, cancer.

7
Carl Allen, 88, American football player.
Tetsuya Chikushi, 73, Japanese journalist and news anchor, lung cancer.
José Bezerra Coutinho, 98, Brazilian bishop of Estância.
Heiko Engelkes, 75, German television journalist (ARD), cancer.
Hedley Howarth, 64, New Zealand cricketer.
Wik Jongsma, 65, Dutch actor, cancer.
Hidetaka Nishiyama, 80, Japanese karate master, cancer.
Heather Pick, 38, American newscaster (WBNS-TV), breast cancer.
Jody Reynolds, 75, American singer and guitarist, liver cancer.
Lyle Williams, 66, American politician, member of the House of Representatives for Ohio (1979–1985), heart attack.
Abraham Woods, 80, American civil rights leader, cancer.

8
Bodil Aakre, 86, Norwegian jurist and politician.
Arne Argus, 83, Swedish newspaper journalist and sports executive.
Mary Lou Beschorner, 79, American baseball player (AAGPBL)
James Byrne, 62, Irish musician.
Richard Fortman, 93, American checkers champion.
Régis Genaux, 35, Belgian footballer, heart failure due to pulmonary embolism.
Joe Hyams, 85, American Hollywood columnist and author, coronary artery disease.
Mieczysław Rakowski, 81, Polish politician, Prime Minister (1988–1989), Workers' Party Chairman (1989–1990), cancer.
Florence Wald, 91, American nurse, hospice pioneer.

9
Joanne H. Alter, 81, American activist and politician, cancer.
Gerald Arthur, 95, Australian cricketer.
Fernand Goux, 108, French penultimate veteran of World War I.
Huda bin Abdul Haq, 48, Indonesian terrorist in 2002 Bali bombings, execution by firing squad.
Anton Huiskes, 80, Dutch Olympic speed skater.
*Hok Lundy, 58, Cambodian National Police Commissioner, helicopter crash.
Carl D. Keith, 88, American co-inventor of the catalytic converter.
Miriam Makeba, 76, South African singer, heart attack.
John Milsum, 83, Canadian control engineer.
Amrozi bin Nurhasyim, 46, Indonesian terrorist in 2002 Bali bombings, execution by firing squad.
Preacher Roe, 92, American baseball pitcher (St. Louis Cardinals, Pittsburgh Pirates, Brooklyn Dodgers), colon cancer.
Stanisław Różewicz, 84, Polish film director.
Imam Samudra, 38, Indonesian terrorist in 2002 Bali bombings, execution by firing squad.

10
Sarah Blacher Cohen, 72, American professor of Jewish literature, complications of Charcot-Marie-Tooth disease. 
Kiyosi Itô, 93, Japanese mathematician, respiratory failure.
Nikola Kavaja, 76, Serbian anti-communist activist and aircraft hijacker, heart attack.
*Li Ximing, 82, Chinese leader of Beijing Communist Party.
Howard Reig, 87, American television announcer.
Arthur Shawcross, 63, American serial killer, cardiac arrest.
Wannes Van de Velde, 71, Belgian singer and artist, leukemia.

11
Mustafa Şekip Birgöl, 105, Turkish last veteran of the Turkish War of Independence.
C. Harmon Brown, 78, American physician, pioneer of sports medicine, cancer.
Tom Hunt, 85, American chairman of Hunt Petroleum, leukemia.
Ľubomír Kadnár, 67, Czechoslovak Olympic sprint canoer. 
Francisco Lozano, 76, Mexican Olympic cyclist.
Alessandro Maggiolini, 77, Italian Bishop of Como, lung cancer.
María Elena Marqués, 83, Mexican actress, heart failure.
Lasse Sandberg, 84, Swedish writer and illustrator of children's literature. 
Herb Score, 75, American baseball pitcher and broadcaster (Cleveland Indians), after long illness.
Jack Scott, 85, British weather forecaster, cancer.
Kanhaiyalal Sethia, 89, Indian poet.

12
Richard Rhys, 9th Baron Dynevor, 73, British aristocrat and patron of the arts, cancer.
Tim L. Hall, 83, American politician, U.S. Representative from Illinois (1975–1977).
Catherine Baker Knoll, 78, American politician, Lieutenant Governor of Pennsylvania since 2003, neuroendocrine cancer.
Vladas Michelevičius, 84, Lithuanian bishop of Vilkaviškis.
Mitch Mitchell, 61, British drummer (The Jimi Hendrix Experience), natural causes.
Margaret Moncrieff, 87, British cellist.
George Morrison, 59, Canadian ice hockey player, brain tumour.
Rex Neame, 72, English cricketer.
Serge Nigg, 84, French composer.
Raymond Routledge, 77, American bodybuilder, AAU Mr. America (1961).

13
Jules Archer, 93, American author.
Marcello Fondato, 84, Italian screenwriter and director.
Bette Garber, 65, American photographer, pneumonia.
Mustapha Oukacha, 75, Moroccan politician, president of the Assembly of Councillors.
Ian Ridley, 74, Australian footballer (Melbourne Demons), emphysema.
Paco Ignacio Taibo I, 84, Mexican writer and journalist, pneumonia.

14
Knut Bjørnsen, 76, Norwegian sports commentator and journalist, pancreatic cancer. 
Michael Ugwu Eneja, 89, Nigerian Bishop of Enugu.
Sir Bernard Feilden, 89, British conservation activist and restoration architect.
Lung Fong, 54, Hong Kong actor, lung cancer,
Irving Gertz, 93, American composer.
Christel Goltz, 96, German soprano.
Kristin Hunter, 77, American writer.
Adrian Kantrowitz, 90, American physician, performed the first pediatric heart transplant, heart failure.
Tsvetanka Khristova, 46, Bulgarian athlete, Olympic dual medallist in discus throw, cancer.
Robert Leith-Macgregor, 91, British World War II pilot.
Charles Le Quintrec, 82, French poet.
Shaukat Hussein Mazari, 60, Pakistani politician, heart attack.
Ajit Kumar Panja, 72, Indian politician, oral cancer.

15
Glen Brand, 85, American wrestler, Olympic gold medalist (1948).
Matthew Cianciulli, 66, American politician, member of the Pennsylvania House of Representatives (1977–1979), heart failure.
Peter Fellgett, 86, British physicist.
Donald Finkel, 79, American poet, complications from Alzheimer's disease.
Grace Hartigan, 86, American painter, liver failure.
Louis Ormont, 90, American psychologist.
Ivan Southall, 87, Australian children's author, cancer.

16
Salah al-Deen Hafez, 70, Egyptian writer.
Bruno Maldaner, 84, Brazilian Bishop of Frederico Westphalen.
Jan Krugier, 80, Polish born Swiss art dealer and holocaust survivor.
Luisín Landáez, 77, Venezuelan-Chilean cumbia singer.
Tony Reedus, 49, American jazz drummer.
Reg Varney, 92, British comedy actor (On the Buses).

17
Don Albinson, 86, American industrial designer.
Peter Aldis, 81, British footballer.
Yaakov Alperon, 53, Israeli organized crime mobster, car bomb.
Irv Anderson, 81, American politician.
Eugene Andolsek, 87, American artistic draughtsman, pneumonia and sepsis.
Sir James Baddiley, 90, British microbiologist.
Irving Brecher, 94, American comedy writer, heart attack.
Ennio de Concini, 84, Italian Academy Award–winning screenwriter.
Debby, 42, Soviet-born Canadian oldest living polar bear, third-oldest known bear, euthanasia due to multiple organ failure.
Malcolm Dalrymple, 85, British Olympic athlete.
Jean-Marie Demange, 65, French member of the National Assembly, Mayor of Thionville (1995–2008), suicide.
Jay Katz, 86, German-born American physician and medical ethicist, heart failure.
Tafadzwa Madondo, 27, Zimbabwean cricketer, motorcycle accident.
George Stephen Morrison, 89, American admiral, father of Jim Morrison.
Pete Newell, 93, Canadian-born American basketball coach.
Guy Peellaert, 74, Belgian painter, illustrator and photographer, cancer.
Floyd Weaver, 67, American baseball player.

18
Manuel Castro Ruiz, 90, Mexican Roman Catholic prelate, Auxiliary Bishop (1965–1969) and Archbishop (1969–1995) of Yucatán.
George C. Chesbro, 68, American novelist, heart failure.
Paul H. Todd, Jr., 87, American politician, member of the House of Representatives from Michigan (1965–1967).

19
Farah Weheliye Addo, 68, Somali sports administrator, heart attack.
Ameer Faisal Alavi, 54, Pakistani general, shot.
Chester Anderson, 90, American football and wrestling coach.
Clive Barnes, 81, American theatre and dance critic, liver cancer.
Karl Bissinger, 94, American photographer.
Carole Caldwell Graebner, 65, American tennis player, cancer.
John Michael Hayes, 89, American screenwriter (Rear Window, BUtterfield 8, To Catch a Thief).
Norman McVicker, 68, English cricketer.
M. N. Nambiar, 89, Indian actor, after short illness.
Edel von Rothe, 83, German ballerina,

20
Teresa Amuli, 61, Mozambican politician, brain tumor.
Raffaele Andreassi, 84, Italian film director.
Seth Anthony, 93, Ghanaian soldier and diplomat.
Aurora Correa, 78, Spanish-born Mexican exiled, writer and educator.
Boris Fyodorov, 50, Russian politician and banker, stroke.
Bennie Gonzales, 84, American Southwestern-style architect (Heard Museum), Alzheimer's disease.
Betty James, 90, American businesswoman, co-founder of the Slinky company, wife of Richard T. James.
Bob Jeter, 71, American football player (Green Bay Packers, Chicago Bears), heart attack.
Jan Machulski, 80, Polish actor (Vabank), heart attack.
Jim Mattox, 65, American politician, member of the House of Representatives (1977–1983), Texas Attorney General (1983–1991).
June Vincent, 88, American actor.

21
Jules Aarons, 87, American space physicist.
Jimmy Abson, 88, Canadian football player.
Augustus Barber, 87, American businessman, cardiac arrest.
Giacomo Bozzano, 75, Italian Olympic boxer.
Marco Allen Chapman, 37, American convicted murderer, execution by lethal injection.
Tom Gish, 82, American journalist and publisher, kidney failure and heart problems.
Gleb Plaksin, 83, French-born Russian actor.
Andrew Rowe, 73, British politician, MP for Faversham and Mid Kent (1983–2001), prostate cancer.

22
Garnet Bougoure, 85, Australian jockey.
MC Breed, 37, American rapper, kidney failure.
Alan Gordon, 64, American songwriter ("Happy Together").
Mario Fernando Hernández, 41, Honduran politician, Deputy Speaker of the National Congress, shot.
Ibrahim Nasir, 82, Maldivian President (1968–1978).
Rashid Rauf, 27, British-born Pakistani al-Qaeda terrorist, air strike.
Sandy Ruby, 67, American entrepreneur, founder of Tech Hifi and Computer City, diabetes.
Ted Wykes, 87, Australian cricket umpire, cancer.

23
Ahmad Aghalou, 59, Iranian actor.
Richard Hickox, 60, British conductor, heart attack.
Jean Markale, 80, French writer and poet.
Fred McAlister, 80, American baseball scout (St. Louis Cardinals).
Mihail Velsvebel, 82, Estonian Olympic athlete.

24
Charlotte Armstrong, 84, American baseball player (AAGPBL)
Tom Burgess, 82, Canadian baseball player and coach, cancer.
Frank Cieciorka, 69, American graphic artist and anti-war activist, emphysema.
Richey James Edwards, 27, British musician (Manic Street Preachers), declared dead on this date (missing since February 1995).
Bep Guidolin, 82, Canadian ice hockey player and coach.
Michael Lee, 39, British rock drummer, seizure.
Kenny MacLean, 52, Canadian bassist (Platinum Blonde), heart attack.
Ray Perrault, 82, Canadian politician, Senator (1973–2001), Liberal Leader of Senate (1974–1982), Parkinson's disease.
John Frederick Powell, 93, British air marshal.
Stefan Schörghuber, 47, German brewing magnate, heart failure.
John R. Stallings, 73, American mathematician.
Cecil H. Underwood, 86, American politician, Governor of West Virginia (1957–1961, 1997–2001).

25
Sunday Ajibade Adenihun, 69, Nigerian politician, heart attack.
William Dowd, 86, American harpsichord maker.
Beno Eckmann, 91, Swiss mathematician.
Ruth Alice Erickson, 95, American Director of the Navy Nurse Corps (1962–1966), pneumonia.
Christian Fechner, 64, French film producer. 
Helmut Friedlaender, 95, German-born American book collector.
William Gibson, 94, American playwright (The Miracle Worker).
Leonard Goodwin, 93, British pharmacologist.
Randy Gumpert, 90, American baseball player.
David M. Jones, 94, American Air Force officer, Doolittle Raider.
George Keegan, 80, Australian politician, heart attack.
Max Oppy, 84, Australian footballer (Richmond).
Brian Pearce, 93, British Marxist historian and translator.
Dudley Savage, 88, British BBC radio presenter.
Gerald Schoenfeld, 84, American theater impresario.
Antanas Vaičius, 82, Lithuanian Roman Catholic prelate, Apostolic Administrator (1982–1989) and Bishop (1989–2001) of Telšiai.

26
Kees Aarts, 66, Dutch soccer player.
Bob Blake, 94, American ice hockey player.
Ralph Burkei, 51, German television producer, fall.
Loumia Hiridjee, 46, Malagasy-born French businesswoman, shot.
Gavriel Holtzberg, 29, Israeli-born American rabbi, shot.
Ashok Kamte, 43, Indian additional commissioner of Mumbai Police, shot.
Vitaly Karayev, 46, Russian mayor of Vladikavkaz, shot.
Hemant Karkare, 54, Indian chief of the Mumbai Anti Terrorist Squad, shot.
Andreas Liveras, 73, Cypriot-born British business tycoon, shot.
Edna Parker, 115, American supercentenarian, oldest validated living person.
Vijay Salaskar, 50-51, Indian encounter specialist with Mumbai Police, shot.
Edwin Ernest Salpeter, 83, Austrian-born American astrophysicist, leukemia.
De'Angelo Wilson, 29, American actor (8 Mile, Antwone Fisher), suicide by hanging.
*Yang Jia, 28, Chinese mass murderer, executed.

27
Adi Da, 69, American-born Fijian artist.
George MacPherson Docherty, 97, British-born American clergyman.
Armand Fabella, 78, Filipino educator, Secretary of Education (1992–1994).
Gideon Gechtman, 66, Israeli artist, heart failure.
Gil Heron, 87, Jamaican football player, father of Gil Scott-Heron.
Paul Hibbert, 56, Australian cricketer.
Cullen Hightower, 84, American author of quips and quotes.
Frances Janssen, 82, American baseball player (AAGPBL).
Patricia Marand, 74, American actress, brain cancer.
Andrew McKelvey, 74, American founder of Monster.com, pancreatic cancer.
Mike Minogue, 85, New Zealand politician, MP (1976–1984), cancer.
Verne Orr, 92, American politician, Secretary of the Air Force (1981–1985).
Pekka Pohjola, 56, Finnish bassist and composer.
Vishwanath Pratap Singh, 77, Indian Prime Minister (1989–1990), blood cancer and renal failure.
Andy Tomasic, 90, American football and baseball player.
Cornelius Clarkson Vermeule III, 83, American scholar of Greek and Roman art, complications from a stroke.

28
Alan Abbott, 82, English cricketer.
Raja Perempuan Budriah, 84, Queen of Malaysia (1960–1965).
Bill Finnegan, 80, American television and film producer (The Fabulous Baker Boys, Hawaii Five-O), Parkinson's disease.
John Harryson, 82, Swedish actor and entertainer.
Joža Karas, 82, Polish-born American musician and teacher.
Sir Hugh Laddie, 62, British intellectual property lawyer and High Court judge, cancer.
Raymond Meyzenq, 73, French cyclist. 
Red Murff, 87, American baseball player (Milwaukee Braves) and scout.
Victor Nieto, 92, Colombian founder and director of the Cartagena Film Festival.
Edoardo Ricci, 80, Italian Bishop of San Miniato.
German Skurygin, 45, Russian race walker, heart attack.
Wo Weihan, 59, Chinese biochemist, executed.
Helena Wolińska-Brus, 89, Polish military prosecutor, pneumonia.
Robert Zarinsky, 68, American serial killer, pulmonary fibrosis.

29
Bill Drake, 71, American radio programmer.
Ulises Dumont, 71, Argentine actor, heart problems.
Arthur Kantrowitz, 95, American physicist and engineer.
Chhabildas Mehta, 83, Indian politician, Chief Minister of Gujarat (1994–1995)
Sten Rudholm, 90, Swedish jurist, member of the Swedish Academy, natural causes.
Jørn Utzon, 90, Danish architect (Sydney Opera House), heart attack.
Georgi Vyun, 54, Russian football player and coach.
Robert Wade, 87, New Zealand-born British chess champion, pneumonia.

30
Béatrix Beck, 94, Belgian writer.
Thomas S. Crow, 74, American military officer, Master Chief Petty Officer of the Navy (1979–1982), cancer.
Naomi Datta, 86, British bacteriologist.
Doris Dungey, 47, American financial blogger, ovarian cancer.
Munetaka Higuchi, 49, Japanese drummer (Loudness), liver cancer.
Ralph A. Lewin, 87, American biologist.
Pit Martin, 64, Canadian ice hockey player, drowned.
Nick George Montos, 92, American felon, oldest inmate in Massachusetts.
Peter Rees, Baron Rees, 81, British politician, Chief Secretary to the Treasury (1983–1985).
Miroslav Sláma, 91, Czechoslovakian Olympic ice hockey player.

References

2008-11
 11